USS Violet was a 166-ton steamer acquired  by the U.S. Navy for use during the American Civil War.

Violet served the Navy in several ways: as a gunboat, as a tugboat, and as a torpedo boat. She served on the U.S. East Coast in the Union blockade of the Confederate States of America.

Built in Brooklyn in 1862 

Violet—a wooden steam tug built as Martha in 1862 at Brooklyn, New York—was purchased by the Navy at New York City on 30 December 1862 for use during the American Civil War; and was commissioned at the New York Navy Yard on 29 January 1863.

Civil War operations 
 
Soon after her commissioning, Violet was dispatched to Newport News, Virginia, for duty as a tugboat with the North Atlantic Blockading Squadron. On 27 March, she received orders to proceed to the blockade off Cape Fear Inlet, near Wilmington, North Carolina, and finally arrived for duty in early April after a storm off Cape Hatteras, North Carolina, had forced her return to Hampton Roads, Virginia, in a sinking condition on 28 March.
 
While off Wilmington, the vessel performed double duty as both a tug and a blockader. On the night of 11 April, she chased and fired upon an unidentified steamer and, in the company of Aries, discovered the blockade-running British steamer Ceres aground and burning at the mouth of the Cape Fear River on 6 December.

When Ceres floated free during the night, Violet seized her and extinguished the fire. Violet, herself, grounded on 20 December while attempting to refloat the Confederate blockade-running steamer Antoniea. She lay aground for two nights and a day; and, at one time, salvagers feared she would become a total loss. However, after her guns had been heaved overboard, the vessel was refloated.

Early in 1864, Violet underwent repairs at the Norfolk Navy Yard, Virginia, and in April was assigned duty as a tug to the ironclad Roanoke off Newport News, Virginia. Her orders were to maintain a vigilant nighttime and foul weather guard over the ironclad and be prepared to tow the warship to safety or run down any enemy vessels in the event of a Confederate attack.

She performed this task until 20 July, when she was fitted with a torpedo device and reassigned to her old blockade station off the Cape Fear River. There, on the night of 7 August, she ran aground while proceeding to her inshore station, close to the shoal off Western Bar, North Carolina.

Despite the efforts of both her crew and volunteers from other nearby vessels to float her off, the tides forced Violet harder aground. Finally, seeing that the situation was hopeless, Violet's captain and crew fired her magazine to prevent capture, and the vessel blew up on the morning of 8 August 1864.

See also 

Union Navy

References 

Ships of the Union Navy
Ships built in Brooklyn
Steamships of the United States Navy
Gunboats of the United States Navy
Torpedo boats of the United States Navy
American Civil War patrol vessels of the United States
1862 ships
Shipwrecks of the American Civil War
Shipwrecks of the Carolina coast
Naval magazine explosions
Maritime incidents in August 1864